This page includes a list of biblical proper names that start with L in English transcription. Some of the names are given with a proposed etymological meaning. For further information on the names included on the list, the reader may consult the sources listed below in the References and External Links.

A – B – C – D – E – F – G – H – I – J – K – L – M – N – O – P – Q – R – S – T – U – V – Y – Z

L

Laadah
Laadan
Laban
Labana
Lachish
Lael
Lahad
Lahairoi
Lahmi
Laish
Lakum, fortification
Lamech
Laodicea
Lapidoth
Lasea
Lasha, fissure
Lazarus
Leah
Lebanon
Lebaoth
Lebbeus
Lebonah
Lecah, progress
Lehabim
Lekah
Lemuel
Leor
Leshem
Letushim
Leummim
Levi, joined, to adhere, adhesion 
Libnah
Libni
Likhi, learned
Lilith
Libya
Linus,
Lior
Lo-ammi
Lod
Lois
Lo-ruhamah
Lot
Lubin
Lucas
Lucifer
Lud
Luhith
Luke, light-giving  
Luz
Lycaonia
Lydda

 Lydia
Leviticus
Lysanias
Lysias
Lysimachus
Lystra

References
Comay, Joan, Who's Who in the Old Testament, Oxford University Press, 1971,  
Lockyer, Herbert, All the men of the Bible, Zondervan Publishing House (Grand Rapids, Michigan), 1958
Lockyer, Herbert, All the women of the Bible, Zondervan Publishing 1988, 
Lockyer, Herbert, All the Divine Names and Titles in the Bible, Zondervan Publishing 1988,  
Tischler, Nancy M., All things in the Bible: an encyclopedia of the biblical world , Greenwood Publishing, Westport, Conn. : 2006

Inline references 

L